Adrian Zackheim is the founder and publisher of the business book imprint Portfolio and the conservative political imprint Sentinel, both divisions of Penguin Books.

At Portfolio, Zackheim has published bestselling books, such as Purple Cow: Transform Your Business by Being Remarkable by Seth Godin, Start With Why by Simon Sinek, and The Smartest Guys in the Room by Bethany McLean and Peter Elkind.

Zackheim is also publisher of Sentinel, a conservative imprint within Penguin. There, he has published George Washington’s Secret Six by Brian Kilmeade and Don Yaeger; and Do the Right Thing and A Simple Christmas by Mike Huckabee.

Other Noted Works
Previously, Zackheim was with HarperCollins, William Morrow, Doubleday, and St. Martin's Press. He has edited many bestsellers including Good to Great by James C. Collins, The Dilbert Principle by Scott Adams, and The HP Way by David Packard.

External links

 Portfolio website

American book editors
Living people
Year of birth missing (living people)